The Apollo-Ridge School District is a small rural public school district. Apollo-Ridge School District encompasses approximately  spanning small portions of two counties. In Armstrong County, it covers the boroughs of Apollo and North Apollo and Kiskiminetas Township.  In Indiana County, it covers Young Township. According to 2000 federal census data, it serves a resident population of 11,202. In 2009, the district residents’ per capita income was $15,287, while the median family income was $39,070. In the Commonwealth, the median family income was $49,501  and the United States median family income was $49,445, in 2010.

The district operates three schools: Apollo-Ridge High School, Apollo-Ridge Middle School and Apollo-Ridge Elementary School.

References

School districts in Armstrong County, Pennsylvania
School districts in Indiana County, Pennsylvania
School districts established in 1970